Dounby is a village on Mainland in Orkney, in the north of Scotland.

Dounby village is situated at the crossroads of what are now the A986 and B9057, and has grown close to the meeting point of the three parishes of Sandwick, Birsay and Harray (mainly lying in Sandwick). It features a Co-operative Food store, a doctor's surgery, pharmacy, care home, pub, post office, hairdressers, church and a community school that serve Birsay, Dounby, Harray, Sandwick, Stenness, and Twatt.

The West Mainland Agricultural Show (commonly called the Dounby Show) occurs here every August on the Thursday before the Orkney County Show in Kirkwall. The County show is always the 2nd Saturday in August.

References

External links

Visit Scotland - Dounby
Canmore - Dounby, Click Mill site record
Murray Foote - Dounby Click Mill
J Heslop-Harrison Autobiography: War Service Part 2 "Dounby"

Villages on Mainland, Orkney